The Admiralty Board is the body established under the Defence Council of the United Kingdom for the administration of the Naval Service of the United Kingdom. It meets formally only once a year, and the day-to-day running of the Royal Navy is conducted by the Navy Board, which does not include any ministers.

The Admiralty Board was established with the abolition of the Board of Admiralty and the integration of the three service ministries into the Ministry of Defence.

The board is chaired by His Majesty's Principal Secretary of State for Defence and includes the professional heads of the navy, as well as various ministers and civil servants of the Ministry of Defence.

Membership of the board
The composition is as follows:
Civilian
Secretary of State for Defence
Minister of State for the Armed Forces
Minister for Defence Procurement
Minister for Defence People and Veterans
Minister for Reserves
Under Secretary of State & the Lords Spokesman on Defence
Finance Director (Navy)
Royal Navy
First Sea Lord and Chief of the Naval Staff
Second Sea Lord and Deputy Chief of Naval Staff 
Fleet Commander
Assistant Chief of the Naval Staff (Policy)

In addition, the following are usually in attendance:
Permanent Under Secretary
Commander, Allied Maritime Command
Commandant General Royal Marines
Warrant Officer of the Naval Service
Two Navy Board non-executive directors

Notes: Secretariat support is provided by the Naval Staff Policy/Secretariat and Sec/1SL.

See also
Army Board
Air Force Board

References

 

Boards of the Royal Navy
Royal Navy personnel
1964 establishments in the United Kingdom
Government agencies established in 1964
Ministry of Defence (United Kingdom)